

601001–601100 

|-bgcolor=#f2f2f2
| colspan=4 align=center | 
|}

601101–601200 

|-bgcolor=#f2f2f2
| colspan=4 align=center | 
|}

601201–601300 

|-bgcolor=#f2f2f2
| colspan=4 align=center | 
|}

601301–601400 

|-bgcolor=#f2f2f2
| colspan=4 align=center | 
|}

601401–601500 

|-bgcolor=#f2f2f2
| colspan=4 align=center | 
|}

601501–601600 

|-bgcolor=#f2f2f2
| colspan=4 align=center | 
|}

601601–601700 

|-bgcolor=#f2f2f2
| colspan=4 align=center | 
|}

601701–601800 

|-id=731
| 601731 Kukuczka ||  || Jerzy Kukuczka (1948–1989), was a Polish alpine and high-altitude climber, who became the second man (after Reinhold Messner) to climb all fourteen eight-thousanders in 1987. || 
|}

601801–601900 

|-bgcolor=#f2f2f2
| colspan=4 align=center | 
|}

601901–602000 

|-id=916
| 601916 Sting ||  || Sting (Gordon M. Sumner, born 1951), an English musician, singer, songwriter and actor, who also co-founded the rock band "The Police". || 
|}

References 

601001-602000